The Central District of Rabor County is a district (bakhsh) in Rabor County, Kerman Province, Iran. At the 2006 census, its population was 22,457, in 5,123 families.  The district has one city: Rabor. The district has two rural districts (dehestan): Rabor Rural District and Siyah Banuiyeh Rural District.

References 

Rabor County
Districts of Kerman Province